The Hispaniolan ten-lined skink (Spondylurus lineolatus) is a species of skink endemic to Hispaniola (both Haiti and the Dominican Republic).

References

Spondylurus
Reptiles described in 1933
Reptiles of the Dominican Republic
Reptiles of Haiti
Lizards of the Caribbean
Endemic fauna of Hispaniola
Taxa named by Gladwyn Kingsley Noble